16 East Broad Street is a building on Capitol Square in Downtown Columbus, Ohio. It stood as the tallest building in the city until being surpassed by 8 East Broad Street in 1906.

From 1927 to 1939, the eleventh floor of the building served as the office for the National Football League. Joseph F. Carr, a Columbus native, was president of the NFL at the time.

See also
 National Register of Historic Places listings in Columbus, Ohio

References

External links
 

Skyscraper office buildings in Columbus, Ohio
Buildings in downtown Columbus, Ohio
Office buildings completed in 1900
Chicago school architecture in Ohio
National Register of Historic Places in Columbus, Ohio
Broad Street (Columbus, Ohio)